Makhdum Rashid , is a town of approximately 30,000 in Multan, Punjab, Pakistan.

Makhdoom Rashid is 20 km distant from Multan towards the east on Vehari Road (old Multan Dehli Road).]

Makhdum Abdul Rashid Haqqani

The town is named after the Sufi saint Makhdum Abdul Rashid Haqqani who founded this town in the 11th century. Makhdum Abdul Rashid Haqqani was born in 569 Hijri and died in 669 Hijri His father's name was Makhdoom Kabeer-ud-Din Ahmad Ghous, from Banu Hashim tribe. He was elder first cousin and brother in law  of Baha-ud-din Zakariya. He was a disciple of Mir Sayyid Ali Hamadani, a Sufi saint buried in Hamadan. 
Haqqani's urs festival is held throughout the month of 
'haar' (June) and attracts pilgrims from other areas. A well near the mausoleum is said to produce water only during the month of haar. It is believed that its water cures physical and spiritual diseases. The origin of this belief is a story that Haqqani suffered from disease and after recovering threw the remaining medicine into the well.

The mausoleum and adjacent unique five-dome mosque, reportedly one of two mosques of its type in the world, displays finest Multani art "Blue Pottery".
File:Family Makhdum Rashid Tree.jpg

Notables 
Allama Abu Al-Khair Asadi was a Sunni Hanfi Islamic poet, philosopher and Muslim scholar. He wrote more than 150 books about Islam. He was the founder of Islamic organization(ادارہ اسلامیہ مخدوم رشید).

References

External links 
Death of Jesus Christ Isa in Quran Islam Hadith & Fiqh by Allama Abu Al-Khair Asadi Makhdoom Rashid

Idarah Islamia - Makhdoom Rasheed - Multan - Pakistan

Populated places in Multan District